Udupi cuisine is a cuisine of South India. It forms an important part of Tuluva cuisine and takes its name from Udupi, a city on the southwest coast of India in the Tulunadu region. Udupi cuisine is strictly vegetarian and has its origin in the Udupi Sri Krishna Matha founded by Madhvacharya. The cuisine was developed by Madhva Brahmins to offer different kinds of food to Lord Krishna at Udupi Krishna Temple.  Hence, Udupi cuisine is also synonymously known as Madhwa cuisine.

Udupi cuisine comprises dishes made primarily from grains, beans, vegetables, and fruits. The variety and range of dishes is wide, and a hallmark of the cuisine involves the use of locally available ingredients. The famous dosa (thick crisp pancakes, plain or masala when stuffed with potatoes) is said to have originated from this cuisine.

Following the tradition of chaaturmasa vrata, which is a restriction of certain food ingredients in a certain period or season, may have led to the innovation of a variety of dishes in Udupi cuisine. Pumpkins and gourds are the main ingredients in sambar, a stew prepared with ground coconut and coconut oil as its base.

The ubiquitous Indian dish dosa has its origins in Udupi, according to P. Thankappan Nair. Saaru, a spicy pepper water, is another essential part of the menu, and so are jackfruit, colocasia leaves, raw green bananas, mango pickle, red chillies, and salt. Adyes (dumplings), ajadinas (dry curries or stir fry curries), and chutneys, including one made of the skin of the ridge gourd, are specialities.

Typical dishes

 Ale bajji
 Bhaji
 Kosambari (seasoned salad of lentils)
 Paayasa (kheer)
 Saaru or rasam
 Spiced rice
 Tallu or Ajethna or ajadina (dry curry)

Full-course Udupi meals

The full course Udupi meal is served on a plantain leaf, which is traditionally kept on the ground. The dishes are served in a particular sequence, and each dish is placed on a particular spot of the plantain leaf. All the people eating this meal are expected to begin and end eating the meal together. A person cannot get up in middle of the meal, even though he has finished his meal. The start and end of meal is done by saying "Govinda," the name of Lord Vishnu. A typical meal is served with the following (in sequence):

 Abbhigara or Ghee
 Salt
 Pickle
 Kosambari (seasoned salad made from split Bengal gram or pea)
 Bajji or chutney
 Ajethna
 Pathrade
 Spiced rice (chitranna)
 Happalla
 Steamed rice
 Saaru(dish) (a spicy watery soup)
 Menaskai
 Koddel
 Majjige Huli, Puli kajippu
 Sweets like laddu, holige or Kesari bhath, Jalebi
 Fried items like bonda, chakli, vada
 Paramanna or Kheer (pudding) or Payasa
 Buttermilk/curd

Depending upon the occasion, individual taste, and money, each dish may be made from different ingredients.

Popular dishes in Udupi cuisine

 Buns (Mangaluru Buns), a sweet dish fried out of Maida flour and Banana
 Idli, dosa, Masala dosa, neer dose, uppu huli kara dosa
 Gashi or Ghasi (thick gravy-like dish made by use of peas or pulses with coconut)
 Kadubu
 Kashi halva from musk pumpkin, jackfruit, banana, and bottle gourd
 Kodhel or sambar (sambar made from lentil, coconut and vegetable of choice)
 Kosambari (salads of green gram or Bengal gram lentils, seasoned)
 Mangalore bajji or Golibaje
 Menaskai (especially made of Amtekai or ambade)
 Patrode (colacasia leaves dipped in batter and steamed cooked)
 Putnis
 Pelakai appa (fried dumplings made from jackfruit)
 Pelakai Gatti/gidde
 Pelakai halwa (jackfruit halwa)
 Puddings or parammanna or payasa or kheer
 Saaru or rasam (rasam made from lentil and tomato)
 Sajjige and bajil (upma made from coarse semolina and seasoned beaten rice)
 Sweet dishes like sajjige, maddi,manni, kaai holige, undae (laddu)
 Uddinahittu (urad flour or potato mashed mixed in curd and seasoned)

Overview of Udupi cuisine

Udupi restaurants
Udupi or Udipi restaurants serving Udupi cuisine can be found all over India and many parts of the world. In the past, these restaurants were run by cooks and priests trained at Krishna matha in Udupi. With rising popularity, many others have entered this business claiming to serve authentic Udupi cuisine. Most Udupi restaurants are family run, with ownership passing among kith and kin of the original owner. Udupi restaurants have undergone many changes in their menu in recent times, adapting to changing economic structure and social statuses in India. They have included vegetarian delicacies from other Indian cuisines.

The first major Udupi restaurant owner, K. Krishna Rao, began his career in food service as an attendant in ceremonies held by the Sri Krishna Temple, wherein food was served to gatherings of the temple staff and pilgrims. In 1922, he moved to Madras and joined Sharada Vilas Brahmins Hotel in George Town as a kitchen servant. He is the inventor of Masala Dosa. In 1925, his employer offered him one of his restaurants for ₹700 monthly. In 1939 Rao started his first hotel Udupi Sri Krishna Vilas, now called Old Woodlands. The other prominent chain of Udupi restaurant is the Dasaprakash group, founded by K. Seetharama Rao, who gave up a low-grade salaried position in Mangalore to join his brothers' snack food (tiffin) business in Mysore in 1921.

In 1923, a major flood devastated Udupi and caused mass migration of male workers and professionals to large cities. This led to a rising demand for low-cost public eating places. Several prominent Udupi restaurants such as Dasaprakash in Mysore, Udupi Sri Krishna Bhavan and Mavalli Tiffin Rooms in Bangalore, were set up to cater to this demand. These restaurants were vegetarian, employed OBCs and upper-caste Hindus from Udupi, and initially, segregated seating spaces along caste lines.

Mumbai, Madras, Mysore, and Bangalore were important destinations for migrants from Udupi, and many restaurants were set up there. In Matunga in Mumbai, many Udupi restaurants such as Ramanayaks and Cafe Madras were established in the 1930s and 1940s. In the following decades, Udupi restaurants spread to all states and are now found in every corner of India. Eventually, it crossed national boundaries and reached cities with Indian diasporas around the world.

Gallery

See also

 Cuisine of Karnataka
 Bengali cuisine
 Mavalli Tiffin Room
 New Woodlands Hotel

References

Further reading
 Yu. Bi Rājalakṣmī, Udupi Cuisine, Prism Books Pvt Ltd. .

Karnataka cuisine
Vegetarian dishes of India
Mangalorean cuisine
Cuisine